The year 2002 is the 1st year in the history of the Cage Rage Championships, a mixed martial arts promotion based in the United Kingdom. In 2002 Cage Rage Championships held 1 event, Cage Rage 1.

Events list

Cage Rage 1

Cage Rage 1 was an event held on September 7, 2002 at The Fusion Leisure Centre, Elephant & Castle in London, United Kingdom.

Results

See also 
 Cage Rage Championships
 List of Cage Rage champions
 List of Cage Rage events

References

Cage Rage Championships events
2002 in mixed martial arts